The women's 3 metre springboard diving competition at the 2006 Asian Games in Doha was held on 13 December at the Hamad Aquatic Centre.

Schedule
All times are Arabia Standard Time (UTC+03:00)

Results

Preliminary

Final

References 

Results

Diving at the 2006 Asian Games